Markeaton is a suburban village within Derby in the East Midlands of England. It is in the Mackworth Ward of Derby City Council.

The village lies on the narrow Markeaton Lane road. It is home to the popular Markeaton Park.

The name is derived from Old English "Mearca's Farm". The spelling was Marcheton in 1086.

After the Norman conquest the manor of Markeaton which had been held by the Anglo-Saxon Siward, the Fairbairn Earl of Northumbria, was given to Hugh d'Avranches, 1st Earl of Chester, along with chevinetum, Mackworth and Allestree.

It finally passed to John the Earl of Huntingdon and Cambridge who died in 1237, his only heirs being his sisters. To prevent the estate passing to women, it was bought by the Crown in 1246.  It was held by various members of the Royal family, including the Black Prince until his death in 1376 when it returned to the Crown.

In the early 14th century the Mundy Family purchased land, Sir John Mundy was Lord Mayor of the City of London in 1522.
The village land was enclosed by the Mundys during the 18th century, forcing many of the villagers to move their homes (literally "Up Sticks") outside the enclosed land.

Markeaton Hall
A grand house, Markeaton Hall was built in a traditional half timbered style, this was replaced by a new hall during the late 18th century.

In 1929, the Markeaton Hall and twenty acres (81,000 m2) of its gardens were given to the Corporation of Derby by the Reverend Clarke Maxwell who had inherited the estate from the late Mrs Mundy, on condition that the whole area would be used as a public park and that the mansion would be maintained for cultural purposes, for example a museum or and art gallery. Unfortunately the hall was used by the Army during World War II and allowed to fall into disrepair after the war.

The council had continually neglected the building, which eventually was declared to be unsafe. The council decided to demolish it, leaving only the Orangery and stable yards.

The Church
Markeaton shares its church with the nearby village of Mackworth. This 13th-century church was fortified, one of the rare examples of such a church, to protect the villagers and their farm stock from raids by the Meynells, who lived at Langley Meynell.

References

External links

Areas of Derby
Villages in Derbyshire
Former civil parishes in Derbyshire